The 2012 M-1 Challenge season was the fifth season of mixed martial arts (MMA) fighting presented by the M-1 Global promotion. The first event of the year, M-1 Challenge 31, was held on March 16, 2012 at the Ice Palace in Saint Petersburg, Russia.

List of events

Event summaries

M-1 Challenge 31

M-1 Challenge 31: Oleinik vs. Monson was held on March 16, 2012 in Saint Petersburg, Russia. In the main event, Alexander Emelianenko defeated Tadas Rimkevičius officially by technical knockout at 1:52 of the second round.  Reports say that the first round of the fight was fairly even, though Emelianenko was able to drop his opponent late in the round.  During the second round, Rimkevičius tapped out to the punches coming from Emelianenko.

The M-1 Global Welterweight Championship was won by Rashid Magomedov from Yasubey Enomoto after a five round unanimous decision victory.  In another featured bout, Jeff Monson faced Alexey Oleinik where Monson won a split decision victory.

Results

M-1 Challenge 32

M-1 Challenge 32 is expected to be held on May 16, 2012 in Moscow, Russia.  The event will include a Lightweight Championship bout in which Daniel Weichel will attempt to defend his title against Yuri Ivlev. But Yuri is injured arm and suffered a bout on June 21 

Fight card

M-1 Challenge 33

M-1 Challenge 33: Emelianenko vs. Magomedov was held on June 6, 2012 in Dzheyrakhsky District, Russia.

Fight card

M-1 Global: Fedor vs. Rizzo

On April 6, 2012, Evgeni Kogan, Director of Global operations for M-1 Global, announced that the promotion will hold an event on June 21, 2012 in Saint Petersburg, Russia.  At this event, Fedor Emelianenko must face with Pedro Rizzo.

On June 21, 2012 in St. Petersburg, Russia, Fedor Emelianenko faced three-time UFC heavyweight title contender Pedro Rizzo in an event promoted by M-1 Global. Prior to the bout, it was rumored that Fedor would retire after taking on Rizzo. Originally denying any possible rumors of retirement at first, Emelianenko later announced his retirement in-ring post-fight after defeating Rizzo by knockout in the first two minutes of the first round.

Fight card

M-1 Challenge 34

M-1 Challenge 34: Emelianenko vs. Glukhov was held on September 30, 2012 in Moscow, Russia

Fight card

M- 1 Challenge 35

M-1 Challenge 35: Emelianenko vs. Monson was held on November 15, 2012 in Ice Palace, Saint Petersburg, Russia.

"'Fight card"'

M-1 Challenge 36

M-1 Challenge 36: Garner vs. Guram II was held in December 8, 2012 in Mytishchi Arena, Mytishchi, Russia.

"'Fight Card"'

See also
 M-1 Global

References

External links
 M-1 Global Official Site

M-1 Global events